The Turkey women's national football team represents Turkey in international women's football. The team was established in 1995, and compete in the qualification for UEFA Women's Championship and the UEFA qualifying of FIFA Women's World Cup. It has been recognized as Türkiye by the FIFA and UEFA since 2022.

The Turkish Football Federation (TFF) is the sports organizing body responsible for forming the women's teams in four age categories as the women's national A team, the women's U-19 national team, the girls' U-17 national team and the girls' U-15 national team.
The women's U-19 national team was formed firstly in 2001, and participate at qualifications for the UEFA Women's Under-19 Championship. The girls' U-17 national team was founded in 2006. They play in the qualifications of the UEFA Women's Under-17 Championship. Established in 2009 with the main objective to develop players for future, the girls' U-15 national team take part at the Youth Olympic Games and various tournaments.

History

The first recorded international match of the Turkey women's national team was the friendly game against Romania held at Zeytinburnu Stadium in Istanbul, Turkey on 8 September 1995, which ended in a 0–8 defeat for the Turkish nationals.  The team took part at the UEFA Women's Euro 1997 qualifying round and debuted in the away match against Hungary on 4 October 1995, losing 0–6.

The nationals won their first match against Georgia at the 1999 FIFA Women's World Cup qualification round on 25 September 1997 after eleven losses.

The biggest loss of the Turkey women's national team was against Germany with 1–12 in a friendly match on 14 February 1999. The team's biggest win was with 9–0 against Georgia at the UEFA Women's Euro 2009 qualifying match on 23 November 2006.

The women's national team were not formed in the years 2003, 2004 and 2005 because the women's football in Turkey was suspended during this period.

Turkey put up its best performance in the 2023 FIFA Women's World Cup qualification, as Turkey acquired an important draw over Portugal and three wins, though the team still failed to qualify at the end.

Team image

Nicknames
The Turkey women's national football team has been known or nicknamed as the "Crescent Stars (Ay-Yıldızlılar)".

Home stadium
Turkey play their home matches on TFF Riva Facility, a facility of the Turkish Football Federation (TFF) for camp and training purposes of all Turkey national football teams. It is located in Riva, Beykoz district of Istanbul Province, Turkey.

Results and fixtures

The following is a list of match results in the last international official tournament, as well as any future matches that have been scheduled.

Legend

2022

2023

Official Turkey Results – TFF.org
Turkey Results and Fixtures – Soccerway.com
Worldfootball.net

All-time records

The following table shows Turkey women's all-time international record:

Matches by year

Coaching staff

Current coaching staff

Manager history

Players

Current squad
The following players were called up for the friendly matches against Jordan, respectively on 12 November and 15 November 2022.
Caps and goals are correct as of 15 November 2022 after the match against Jordan.

Recent call-ups
The following players have been called up for the team within the last 12 months and are still available for selection.

Notes
PRE = Preliminary squad/standby.
INJ = It is not part of the current squad due to injury.
COV = The player is not part of the current squad due to has been tested positive for COVID-19.

Gallery

Records

Most capped players

Players in bold are still active.

Top goalscorers

Bold indicates still active players.

Hat-tricks

Centuriate goals

Competitive record

FIFA Women's World Cup

*Draws include knockout matches decided on penalty kicks.

Olympic Games

*Draws include knockout matches decided on penalty kicks.

UEFA Women's Championship

*Draws include knockout matches decided on penalty kicks.

FIFA World Rankings
Last update 13 July 2021.

 Best Ranking   Worst Ranking   Best Mover   Worst Mover

See also

List of Turkey women's international footballers
Turkey women's national under-17 football team
Turkey women's national under-19 football team
Turkey women's national under-21 football team
Turkey women's national football team (Results)
Women's football in Turkey
Turkish Women's Cup

References

External links
 Official website, TFF.org
 FIFA profile, FIFA.com

 
European women's national association football teams